Barbus pergamonensis is a species of ray-finned fish in the genus Barbus. It occurs in western Turkey and on the island of Lesbos.

References 

 

pergamonensis
Cyprinid fish of Asia
Freshwater fish of Europe
Fish of Turkey
Fish described in 1971